Antti Valkama (31 July 1889 – 26 July 1974) was a Finnish sports shooter. He competed in three events at the 1924 Summer Olympics.

References

External links
 

1889 births
1974 deaths
Finnish male sport shooters
Olympic shooters of Finland
Shooters at the 1924 Summer Olympics
People from Mäntsälä
Sportspeople from Uusimaa